Serhiy Rebrov Club is a non-official name of the list of football players who have scored 100 or more goals during their professional career in the Ukrainian Premier League only. This club is named after the first player to score 100 goals in Ukrainian Premier League – Serhiy Rebrov, who reached this milestone during the 1999–2000 season.

Serhiy Rebrov and Maksim Shatskikh share the record for most goals scored, while the most recent player to join the club is Yevhen Seleznyov, who did it on 3 May 2015.

For Ukrainian players who have scored 100 or more goals during their professional career in Ukraine, there is the Timerlan Huseinov club. Aside from that, there is also another club (Oleh Blokhin club) that is designated for all Ukrainian players who have scored 100+ goals during their professional career in and outside Ukraine playing for Ukrainian and/or Soviet clubs and national teams.

Serhiy Rebrov Club  
 Bold shows players still playing in the Ukrainian Premier League.
 Italics show players still playing professional football in other leagues

Candidates 
List includes active players who are 10 goals away (90-99) to join the club.

Notes

References

External links
  All-time Vyscha Liha scorers

See also
Timerlan Huseinov club

Ukrainian football trophies and awards
Lists of association football players
Ukrainian Premier League